Rafael García Jr. (born August 5, 1994) is an American-born Mexican mixed martial artist who competes in the Lightweight division of the Ultimate Fighting Championship. A professional mixed martial artist since 2014, García is also a former Combate Americas Lightweight Champion.

Background
García was born in Brawley, California to Mexican parents and grew up in El Centro, California, and has a sister and a younger brother. He started training martial arts at the age of 13 when his father took him to a gym to learn self-defense. He graduated from Imperial High School where he wrestled for one year. He lives in Mexicali, Baja California since 2013.

Mixed martial arts career

Early career
Racking up a 4–0 record in Mexico, García participated in the inaugural Combate Americas open tryouts and receiving a contract after winning the tryouts. In Combate Americas García went undefeated 8–0 and claiming the Combate Americas Lightweight Championship against Erick Gonzalez at Combate 44 on September 20, 2019. He successfully defended the title against Humberto Bandenay at Combate 55 on February 21, 2020. On June 13, 2020, García announced that he had vacated the title.

Ultimate Fighting Championship
On March 10, 2021, it was announced that García would be replacing Don Madge against Nasrat Haqparast at UFC Fight Night: Edwards vs. Muhammad on March 13, 2021. He lost the fight via unanimous decision.

In his sophomore appearance, García faced Chris Gruetzemacher at UFC on ESPN: Hall vs. Strickland on July 31, 2021. Despite knocking Gruetzemacher down in the first round, García went on to lose the fight via unanimous decision.

García then faced Natan Levy at UFC Fight Night: Vieira vs. Tate on November 20, 2021. He won the bout via unanimous decision.

García faced Jesse Ronson on April 16, 2022 at UFC on ESPN 34. He won the fight via rear-naked choke in round two.

García faced Drakkar Klose, replacing injured Carlos Diego Ferreira, on July 30, 2022 at UFC 277. He lost the fight via unanimous decision.

García faced Hayisaer Maheshate on December 17, 2022 at UFC Fight Night 216. At the weigh-ins, Hayisaer Maheshate weighed in at 158.5 pounds, two and a half pounds over the lightweight non-title fight limit. The bout proceeded at catchweight and Maheshate was fined 20% of his purse, which went to García. García won the fight via unanimous decision.

García is scheduled to face Clay Guida on April 15, 2023 at UFC on ESPN 44.Rafa García

Personal life
García and his wife have a daughter (born 2019) and a son (born 2021), both born in Mexicali, Mexico.

Championships and accomplishments
Combate Americas
Combate Americas Lightweight Championship (one time; first; former)
One successful title defense

Mixed martial arts record

|-
|Win
|align=center|14–3
|Hayisaer Maheshate
|Decision (unanimous)
|UFC Fight Night: Cannonier vs. Strickland
| 
|align=center|3
|align=center|5:00
|Las Vegas, Nevada, United States
| 
|-
|Loss
|align=center|13–3
|Drakkar Klose
|Decision (unanimous)
|UFC 277
|
|align=center|3
|align=center|5:00
|Dallas, Texas, United States
|
|-
| Win
| align=center| 13–2
|Jesse Ronson
|Submission (rear-naked choke)
|UFC on ESPN: Luque vs. Muhammad 2 
|
|align=center|2
|align=center|4:50
|Las Vegas, Nevada, United States
|
|-
| Win
| align=center| 12–2
| Natan Levy
| Decision (unanimous)
|UFC Fight Night: Vieira vs. Tate
|
|align=center|3
|align=center|5:00
|Las Vegas, Nevada, United States
|
|-
| Loss
| align=center|11–2
|Chris Gruetzemacher
|Decision (unanimous)
|UFC on ESPN: Hall vs. Strickland 
|
|align=center|3
|align=center|5:00
|Las Vegas, Nevada, United States
|
|-
| Loss
| align=center|11–1
| Nasrat Haqparast
|Decision (unanimous)
|UFC Fight Night: Edwards vs. Muhammad
|
|align=center|3
|align=center|5:00
|Las Vegas, Nevada, United States
|
|-
| Win
| align=center| 11–0
| Humberto Bandenay
|Decision (unanimous)
|Combate 55: Mexicali
|
|align=center|3
|align=center|5:00
|Mexicali, Mexico
|
|-
| Win
| align=center|10–0
| Erick Gonzalez
| Decision (unanimous)
| Combate 44: Mexicali
| 
| align=center|3
| align=center|5:00
| Mexicali, Mexico
| 
|-
| Win
| align=center|9–0
| Estevan Payan
|Submission (rear-naked choke)
|Combate 39: Unbreakable
|
|align=center|1
|align=center|4:50
|Tucson, Arizona, United States
|
|-
| Win
| align=center|8–0
| Edgar Escarrega
| Submission (rear-naked choke)
|Combate 30: Mexicali
|
|align=center|2
|align=center|1:07
|Mexicali, Mexico
| 
|-
| Win
| align=center| 7–0
| LaRue Burley
|KO (punches)
|Combate 24: Alday vs. Lopez
|
|align=center|1
|align=center|2:26
|Phoenix, Arizona, United States
| 
|-
| Win
| align=center| 6–0
| Chase Gibson
|Decision (majority)
|Combate 20: Combate Estrellas 1
|
|align=center| 3
|align=center| 5:00
|Los Angeles, California, United States
|
|-
| Win
| align=center| 5–0
|Marcos Bonilla
|Submission (armbar)
|Combate 17: El Grito En La Jaula
|
|align=center|2
|align=center|1:07
|Redlands, California, United States
|
|-
| Win
| align=center| 4–0
| Raúl Najera Ocampo
| Submission (heel hook)
| Combate 10
| 
| align=center| 1
| align=center| 1:04
| Mexico City, Mexico
| 
|-
| Win
| align=center| 3–0
| Jovany Amador
|Submission (armbar)
|Warrior Championship Fighting 8
|
|align=center|1
|align=center|3:21
|Mexicali, Mexico
|
|-
| Win
| align=center| 2–0
| Mike Sandoval
| Submission (armbar)
|Warrior Championship Fighting 6
|
| align=center|1
| align=center|0:24
|Mexicali, Mexico
|
|-
| Win
| align=center|1–0
| Dante Ramos
| Submission (armbar)
| Extreme Full Contact 4
|
|align=center|1
|align=center|2:06
|Mexicali, Mexico
|

See also 
 List of current UFC fighters
 List of male mixed martial artists

References

External links
 
 

1994 births
Living people
Mexican male mixed martial artists
Lightweight mixed martial artists
Mixed martial artists utilizing Brazilian jiu-jitsu
Ultimate Fighting Championship male fighters
Mexican practitioners of Brazilian jiu-jitsu